Timeline (subtitled An Introduction to The Vision Bleak) is a compilation album by German gothic metal band The Vision Bleak. Their first compilation album ever, it was announced on 27 March 2016 and released on 3 June (the same release date of their sixth studio album, The Unknown) by Prophecy Productions. Intended to celebrate the band's 16th anniversary, and to introduce newcomers to their music, the album contains an assortment of songs ranging from their 2004 debut The Deathship Has a New Captain to their most recent release, 2016's The Unknown.

Track listing

Personnel
 Ulf Theodor Schwadorf (Markus Stock) – vocals, guitars, bass, keyboards
 Allen B. Konstanz (Tobias Schönemann) – vocals, drums, keyboards
 Martin Koller – production

References

The Vision Bleak albums
2016 compilation albums